The 1963–64 season was Leeds United's 37th season in the Football League, and their fourth consecutive season in the Football League Second Division, the second tier of English football, where they finished first, and won promotion back to the First Division. Alongside the Second Division, the club competed in the FA Cup and the Football League Cup, being eliminated in the fourth round of both competitions.

Background

Season summary

Competitions

Second Division

League table

Matches

FA Cup

League Cup

References

1963-64
English football clubs 1963–64 season